The 1968 Soviet Class A Second Group was the sixth season of the Soviet Class A Second Group football competitions that was established in 1963. It was also the 28th season of the Soviet second tier league competition.

First stage

First subgroup

Number of teams by republics

Second subgroup

Number of teams by republics

Third subgroup

Number of teams by republics

Fourth subgroup

Number of teams by republics

Final stage

For places 1-4
 [Nov 17-24, Sochi]

Relegation Tournament for Ukraine
 [Nov 12-20]

See also
 Soviet First League

External links
 1968 season. RSSSF

1968
2
Soviet
Soviet